Jorge Garbajosa Chaparro (born December 19, 1977), also known as The Pornoplayer, is a Spanish former professional basketball player and the current president of the Spanish Basketball Federation. Standing at 2.07 m (6 ft 9  in), he played both power forward and small forward. He was an All-EuroLeague first team selection in 2003, and an All-EuroLeague second team selection in 2006, while playing for Unicaja. During his stint in the NBA, he was named to the NBA All-Rookie First Team in 2007. A serious injury the following season cut his NBA career short, and he never truly recovered until his retirement.

He played internationally with the senior Spain national team, which won a bronze medal at the EuroBasket 2001, two silver medals at the EuroBasket 2003 and 2007, and a gold medal at the EuroBasket 2009. During his tenure their highest achievement was the gold medal at the 2006 World Cup, where his stellar play earned him All-tournament honors. In 2006, Garbajosa was named Mr Europa Player of the year by Italian weekly magazine SuperBasket.

Professional career

Europe
Garbajosa began his career playing for Taugrés, later known as TAU Cerámica, between 1995 and 2000. In the 1998–99 season, he guided Baskonia to a Spanish King's Cup victory.

Garbajosa then spent four seasons at Benetton Treviso between 2000 and 2004 under future Toronto Raptors Vice-President and Assistant General Manager Maurizio Gherardini and New York Knicks head coach Mike D'Antoni. He won two Italian National Cups, two Italian Super Cups and two Italian League championships with Benetton and averaged 13.8 points, 6.7 rebounds and a EuroLeague-best 2.85 steals per game, en route to All-EuroLeague 2002–03 First Team honors, and being named the 2003 Eurobasket.com Player of the Year.

Garbajosa spent his next two seasons (2004–06) with Unicaja, helping them to win the 2005–06 Spanish League championship and Spanish Cup. He was in the top 15 in scoring (14.9 points per game) and rebounding (6.9 rebounds per game) in the 2005–06 EuroLeague season, and averaged 13.3 points and 6.4 rebounds domestically, in 42 Spanish league outings, shooting 55% from the field and 81% from the free throw line. Garbajosa was also the 2005 Spanish Cup MVP, and the 2006 Spanish League Finals MVP, and earned All-EuroLeague Second Team honors.

Overall, in his 11 seasons with the three clubs, Garbajosa had regular-season averages of 10.4 points, 5.2 rebounds and 1.4 steals in 362 Spanish national domestic league games, and averaged 13.0 points, 6.3 rebounds and 1.8 steals in 105 EuroLeague games.

NBA

On July 24, 2006, the Toronto Raptors officially signed Garbajosa to a three-year contract amounting to about US$12 million. He wore number 15 for the Raptors, previously worn by ex-Raptors star Vince Carter. Given his pedigree, Garbajosa was a regular starter at the forward position. For the first half of the season, Garbajosa was instrumental in driving the Raptors past the .500 mark and he was awarded Eastern Conference Rookie of the Month honours in December 2006.

On March 26, 2007, Garbajosa suffered an injury to his left leg during a regular-season matchup against the Boston Celtics. The injury was serious, as he was carried out on a stretcher in considerable pain. Doctors in Toronto performed surgery to repair a broken fibula, a displaced ankle and ligament damage. Because his recovery time was estimated to be in the range of six months, he was forced to miss the rest of the season and the entire post-season. He averaged 8.5 points and 4.9 rebounds per game after 67 appearances in his debut season for the Raptors. Garbajosa and Raptors teammate Andrea Bargnani were named to the NBA All-Rookie Team at the end of the season.

Garbajosa returned to play with the Raptors for the 2007–08 season, but after meeting with a specialist on November 26, he chose to have further surgery on his leg and ankle. The operation took place on December 11, 2007.

In June 2008, negotiations took place in an attempt by the Raptors to buy out the remaining year of his contract. Garbajosa had previously been named to the 2008 Spanish Olympic basketball squad, against the wishes of the Raptors. On June 18, 2008, the Raptors officially bought out Garbajosa's contract.

While playing for the Raptors, his nickname was "The Garbage Man."

Return to Europe
In the 2008 off-season, Garbajosa signed a two-year, €6 million net income contract with the Russian Super League club Khimki Moscow Region, giving him one of the most expensive contracts in Europe. The next year, however, he was allowed to terminate his contract in order to return to Spain to sign with Real Madrid. The transfer was announced by the club after weeks of speculation on August 15, 2009. In 2011, Garbajosa and Real Madrid reached an agreement to rescind the player's contract. In March 2011, he signed with Unicaja. In May 2012, he decided to end his career.

National team career
Garbajosa played internationally with the senior Spain national teams at two Summer Olympiads: the 2000 and 2004.  He also won medals at two EuroBaskets: a bronze medal in 2001, and a silver medal in 2003.

On September 3, 2006, his team won the gold medal at the 2006 FIBA World Championship; he scored a game-high 20 points and collected 10 rebounds in the final against Greece. His tournament average was 12.6 points and 5.3 rebounds. In addition to winning the gold medal, Garbajosa made the All-Tournament team, along with teammate Pau Gasol.

On January 1, 2007, Garbajosa was named Mister Europa 2006, by Italian weekly magazine SuperBasket. Some of the other NBA players that have been given that award are Dirk Nowitzki (2005) and Pau Gasol (2004).

At the 2007 EuroBasket, Garbajosa was a key player for the Spanish team. He averaged 7.8 points per game and 3.1 rebounds per game, in nine games, but Spain lost 59–60 to the Russian national team in the final. He went on to win a silver medal at the 2008 Summer Olympic Games, and a gold medal at the 2009 EuroBasket.

Post-retirement
On 9 July 2016, Garbajosa was appointed as President of the Spanish Basketball Federation.

Career statistics

EuroLeague

|-
| style="text-align:left;"| 2000–01
| style="text-align:left;" rowspan=4| Benetton
| 15 || 13 || 24.6 || .621 || .524 || .712 || 4.9 || .9 || 1.3 || .8 || 12.4 || 15.8
|-
| style="text-align:left;"| 2001–02
| 20 || 16 || 26.4 || .466 || .351 || .823 || 5.9 || 1.1 || 2.0 || .6 || 11.5 || 15.4
|-
| style="text-align:left;"| 2002–03
| 22 || 21 || 27.9 || .429 || .391 || .756 || 6.7 || 1.2 || style="background:#cfecec;"|2.3 || .7 || 12.3 || 19.3
|-
| style="text-align:left;"| 2003–04
| 18 || 17 || 28.3 || .519 || .410 || .714 || 5.8 || 1.1 || 1.7 || .6 || 13.8 || 18.1
|-
| style="text-align:left;"| 2004–05
| style="text-align:left;" rowspan=2| Unicaja
| 13 || 12 || 32.9 || .413 || .348 || .800 || 7.8 || 1.7 || 1.6 || .9 || 14.0 || 21.2
|-
| style="text-align:left;"| 2005–06
| 18 || 16 || 35.2 || .411 || .396 || .771 || 6.9 || 2.3 || 1.8 || .8 || 14.9 || 19.3
|-
| style="text-align:left;"| 2009–10
| style="text-align:left;" rowspan=2| Real Madrid
| 20 || 16 || 21.9 || .455 || .373 || .786 || 4.0 || 1.1 || .6 || .2 || 8.2 || 9.8
|-
| style="text-align:left;"| 2010–11
| 11 || 1 || 16.2 || .422 || .345 || .786 || 2.7 || .3 || .6 || .5 || 5.4 || 6.5
|-
| style="text-align:left;"| 2011–12
| style="text-align:left;"| Unicaja
| 14 || 3 || 20.0 || .353 || .271 || 1.000 || 2.9 || .9 || .9 || .2 || 6.2 || 6.8
|- class="sortbottom"
| style="text-align:center;" colspan="2"| Career
| 151 || 115 || 26.3 || .538 || .374 || .772 || 5.4 || 1.2 || 1.5 || .6 || 11.2 || 15.1

NBA

|-
| style="text-align:left;"| 
| style="text-align:left;"| Toronto
| 67 || 60 || 28.5 || .420 || .342 || .731 || 4.9 || 1.9 || 1.2 || .2 || 8.5
|-
| style="text-align:left;"| 
| style="text-align:left;"| Toronto
| 7 || 0 || 10.6 || .320 || .375 || .000 || 2.1 || .4 || .4 || .0 || 3.1
|- class="sortbottom"
| style="text-align:center;" colspan="2"| Career
| 74 || 60 || 26.8 || .415 || .344 || .731 || 4.7 || 1.7 || 1.1 || .2 || 8.0

See also

List of National Basketball Association undrafted players

References

External links

 Jorge Garbajosa on Twitter 
 NBA.com Profile
 Euroleague.net Profile
 
 Spanish League Profile 

1977 births
Living people
Basketball players at the 2000 Summer Olympics
Basketball players at the 2004 Summer Olympics
Basketball players at the 2008 Summer Olympics
BC Khimki players
Baloncesto Málaga players
FIBA World Championship-winning players
Lega Basket Serie A players
Liga ACB players
Medalists at the 2008 Summer Olympics
National Basketball Association players from Spain
Olympic basketball players of Spain
Olympic medalists in basketball
Olympic silver medalists for Spain
Pallacanestro Treviso players
People from Torrejón de Ardoz
Basketball players from the Community of Madrid
Power forwards (basketball)
Real Madrid Baloncesto players
Saski Baskonia players
Spanish expatriate basketball people in Canada
Spanish expatriate basketball people in Italy
Spanish expatriate basketball people in Russia
Spanish men's 3x3 basketball players
Spanish men's basketball players
Toronto Raptors players
Undrafted National Basketball Association players
2002 FIBA World Championship players
2006 FIBA World Championship players
2010 FIBA World Championship players